In enzymology, a chondroitin-glucuronate 5-epimerase is an enzyme that catalyzes the chemical reaction

chondroitin D-glucuronate  dermatan L-iduronate

Hence, this enzyme has one substrate, chondroitin D-glucuronate, and one product, dermatan L-iduronate.

This enzyme belongs to the family of isomerases, specifically those racemases and epimerases acting on carbohydrates and derivatives.  The systematic name of this enzyme class is chondroitin-D-glucuronate 5-epimerase. Other names in common use include polyglucuronate 5-epimerase, dermatan-sulfate 5-epimerase, urunosyl C-5 epimerase, and chondroitin D-glucuronosyl 5-epimerase.  This enzyme participates in chondroitin sulfate biosynthesis.

References

 

EC 5.1.3
Enzymes of unknown structure